The list of aircraft accidents and incidents caused by structural failures summarizes notable accidents and incidents such as the 1933 United Airlines Chesterton Crash due to a bombing and a 1964 B-52 test that landed after the vertical stabilizer broke off.  Loss of structural integrity during flight can be caused by:
 faulty design
 faulty maintenance
 manufacturing flaws
 pilot error
 weather conditions
 sabotage (e.g., an airliner bombing by a skyjacker).

References

Notes

Citations

Bibliography
 Gero, David B. Military Aviation Disasters: Significant Losses Since 1908. Sparkford, Yoevil, Somerset, UK: Haynes Publishing, 2010, 

Structural